Oak Hill Academy is a coeducational, nonsectarian private day school located in Lincroft, in Monmouth County, New Jersey, United States, serving students in pre-Kindergarten through eighth grade. Oak Hill Academy was founded in September 1981 by educator Joseph A. Pacelli. The school is academically rigorous and boasts advanced courses in mathematics and Latin. Oak Hill has swimming as a mandatory part of the physical education program.

As of the 2017–18 school year, the school had an enrollment of 296 students and 40.8 classroom teachers (on an FTE basis), for a student–teacher ratio of 7.3:1. The school's student body was 67.9% (201) White, 17.2% (51) Asian, 8.8% (26) two or more races, 3.4% (10) Black and 2.7% (8) Hispanic. The average student per academic class is 15.

Oak Hill Academy is a member of the Educational Records Bureau and the New Jersey Association of Independent Schools. The school was accredited by the Middle States Association of Colleges and Schools in 1986, 1996, and 2008.

Academic program

Upper School
Grades five to eight, separated and departmentalized classes are taught by teachers who are experts in their subject areas. Daily sessions in literature, language arts, math, science, and social studies stress critical thinking, communication skills, writing ability, and good organizational habits. These courses, as well as French, Latin, Spanish, critical reading, music, drama,  computer science, art, and physical education provide an excellent preparation for high school years. "Explorations," a research-based program and a project-oriented "math workshop," allow students to work hands-on in cooperative groups using technology.

Languages
For grades Pre-K-8, they all take a language. For grades Pre-K to 4, they take French. In upper school, grades 5-7, French is taken one half of the year, and Spanish is taken the other half. But in 8th grade, the students get to choose whichever language they like best to take for the whole year. French and Spanish 8th graders are ready for French and Spanish 2, 2 honors and at times French or Spanish 3 in high school depending upon the curriculum.  Oak Hill Academy offers a two-year Latin program in the 7th and 8th grade.

Lower School
Beginning with a full-day kindergarten program, the curriculum is designed with the stages of child development in mind. Traditional areas of reading, writing, mathematics, science, and social studies are taught in a hands-on manner. These basic areas are complemented by Orff music, drama, computer science, art, library, physical education, French. An innovative enrichment program offers changing themes in a special "HandsOn/HeadsOn" room where real-life activities are based on grade level curriculum.

Pre-Kindergarten 
Learning and self-confidence are encouraged through discovery and play with an emphasis on all aspects of childhood development. Well-equipped interest areas allow for multisensory involvement of the student in inter-disciplinary subjects. The reading and math programs are an excellent preparation for the lower school curriculum.

Policy

Dress Code
Oak Hill is a private school with a uniform dress code. For girls, they must wear the navy blue school sweater, skirts (in blue tan or gray), blouses (blue, yellow, pink, white, tan), and shoes. No sneakers are permitted (except during gym). During the winter, girls may wear pants in the same three colors. Boys must wear the school sweater, pants (in blue, tan or gray), shirts (blue, tan, pink, yellow, white), shoes, and a tie and belt.

References

External links
Oak Hill Academy website
Data for Oak Hill Academy, National Center for Education Statistics

1981 establishments in New Jersey
Educational institutions established in 1981
Middletown Township, New Jersey
New Jersey Association of Independent Schools
Private elementary schools in New Jersey
Private middle schools in New Jersey
Schools in Monmouth County, New Jersey